Sanjoy Kishan (born January 26, 1970 in Dhelakhat, Assam) is a Bharatiya Janata Party politician from Assam. He was elected to the Assam Legislative Assembly election in 2016, representing the Tinsukia constituency.

Early life 
Sanjoy Kishan was born on 26 January 1970 to the late Mohanlal Kishan and the late Bisoka Kishan in Dhelakhat. He is a Class X (matric) pass.

Political Career 
He was elected in 2016 to the Assembly for Tinsukia. He became a minister in Sarbananda Sonowal’s cabinet, and is currently a minister in Himanta Biswa Sarma’s cabinet.

Personal life 
He married Rahil Mundu Kishan on 20 July 2004, with whom he has two daughters.

References 

1970 births
Living people
Bharatiya Janata Party politicians from Assam
Assam MLAs 2016–2021
People from Tinsukia district
Assam MLAs 2021–2026